Ellen Druffel is an American oceanographer and isotope geochemist known for her research using radiocarbon to track marine processes.

Career

Druffel is a professor who holds the Fred Kavli Endowed Chair in Earth System Science at U.C. Irvine, where she was one of the department's founding faculty members. She received a B.S. in Chemistry from Loyola Marymount University in 1975 and a PhD in Chemistry in 1980 from the Department of Chemistry at U.C. San Diego, where her Ph.D. advisor was Hans Suess.

Awards

In 1990, Druffel received the James B. Macelwane Medal from the American Geophysical Union. Druffel is a fellow of the American Association for the Advancement of Science (2001), and a fellow of The Oceanography Society (2009). In 2004 she was awarded the Ruth Patrick Award from the American Society of Limnology and Oceanography.  The Ruth Patrick Award is given "to honor outstanding research by a scientist in the application of basic aquatic science principles to the identification, analysis and/or solution of important environmental problems.". Druffel's Ruth Patrick award acknowledged "her sustained critical contributions on the composition and age of dissolved, particulate, and sedimentary carbon and for furthering the understanding of the processes governing the fate and distribution of oceanic carbon and the important role that the oceans play in global carbon flux." In 2016 she was awarded the Roger Revelle Medal from the American Geophysical Union. Druffel was elected to the National Academy of Sciences in 2020.

Research
Druffel's research uses radiocarbon to track marine processes, focusing in two areas: coral paleoclimate records and marine organic matter carbon cycling. She is the author of more than 180 publications in the scientific literature.

Selected publications

References

External links
 

Women oceanographers
Living people
Loyola Marymount University alumni
American women scientists
American oceanographers
1953 births
University of California, San Diego alumni
University of California, Irvine faculty
21st-century American women